Mirzabari Union is a union of Madhupur Upazila, Tangail District, Bangladesh.

Demographics
According to the 2011 Bangladesh census, Mirzabari Union had 6,346 households and a population of 24,278. The literacy rate (age 7 and over) was 35.5% (male: 36.2%, female: 34.9%).

See also
 Union Councils of Tangail District

References

Populated places in Tangail District
Unions of Madhupur Upazila